Robert "Rob" Schamberger is an American painter known for his portraiture of professional wrestlers. He is currently the host of Canvas 2 Canvas on the WWE Network.

Personal life and education 
Schamberger currently resides in Kansas City.

Technique 
Rob's technique involves the tracing and copying of promotional images or video stills to paper or canvas after which he uses various materials such as acrylic, watercolour, ink, and paint markers, to create his work. Often many materials are used in the same painting in a mixed media fashion. Schamberger uses synthetic round brushes in a variety of sizes as well as a painting knife to create his works. Regarding tracing, Schamberger himself has stated - "Man, I could give a damn."

Schamberger utilizes unusual colour combinations and uses a technique not unlike the posturization tool in Photoshop to break down the original reference photos to create something unique when compared to the source material.

Career 
Schamberger hosts the Canvas 2 Canvas YouTube show with the WWE Network. On the show Schamberger unveils new portraits of past and current wrestlers.

Schamberger is the official WWE Artist in Residence.[7]  While Schamberger operates an independent store, most of his WWE artwork is purchased by the WWE organization and sold through their official storefronts and auctions. Schamberger's work is printed on a variety of WWE merchandise, including tee shirt designs.

External links

References 

American painters
Living people
Year of birth missing (living people)
20th-century American painters
21st-century American painters